Ally Samantha Prisock (born January 18, 1997) is an American professional soccer player who currently plays for the GPSO 92 Issy on loan from Houston Dash of the National Women's Soccer League (NWSL).

Early years
Prisock was born to Aaron Prisock and Nickie Jennings and grew up in Fontana, California alongside sisters Ashley and Alyssa.  She attended Rancho Cucamonga High School and after committing to USC her junior year she took summer classes in order to graduated early from high school, December of her senior year, in order to be able to attend spring training at USC.

College career
Prisock played four years for the University of Southern California Trojans, including their 2016 NCAA Tournament Championship year.   During her time at USC she made 90 appearances, starting in every game of her college career.  She set appearance records for most appearances by a Trojan player and became one of only three players in program history to start every game in their freshman year.  During her time at USC she was known for her dedication and commitment to training every day. She also helped lead the Trojans to four consecutive NCAA tournament appearances, finishing her career being named a first-team All-American and a semifinalist for the MAC Hermann Trophy.

Professional career

Houston Dash, 2019– 

Prisock entered the 2019 NWSL College Draft and was selected in the second round with the 12th overall pick by the Houston Dash.  She attended the Dash's 2019 preseason and started in their preseason game against Texas A&M. Prisock was signed by the Dash in April 2019.  She made her regular season debut on June 15, 2019.

International career
Prisock was first called up to United States national team camps at the U-14 NDP, U-15 GNT and U-17 WNT level. She made her debut for the United States with the U-19 national team against the New Zealand WNT.   On her second appearance, this time against the New Zealand U-20 WNT, Prisock scored a goal.

Career statistics 
As of June 15, 2019

Honors

College

2016 NCAA Division I Women's Soccer Tournament

References

External links
NWSL Ally Prisock
Houston Dash Ally Prisock

Ally Prisock Instagram
Ally Prisock Twitter

Living people
1997 births
American women's soccer players
USC Trojans women's soccer players
National Women's Soccer League players
Houston Dash draft picks
Houston Dash players
Soccer players from California
People from Fontana, California
Women's association football forwards
African-American women's soccer players
21st-century American women